Fritz Wotruba (23 April 1907, Vienna, Austria – 28 August 1975, Vienna) was an Austrian sculptor of Czecho-Hungarian descent. He was considered one of the most notable sculptors of the 20th century in Austria. In his work, he increasingly dissolves figurative components in favor of geometrical abstraction with the shape of the cube as the basic form.

Life 
Fritz Wotruba was born in 1907 as the youngest of eight children of Adolf Wotruba (who came from Bohemia to work as a tailor's assistant) and Maria Wotruba, née Kocsi (from Hungary, working as a maid), in Vienna. Adolf was an alcoholic and violent, often beating his sons and his wife - as described in the auto-biography of Elias Canetti, Das Augenspiel, who befriended him in 1933, writing a very positive assessment of his work in 1954. His eldest brother was imprisoned for armed robbery and murder, and died in prison at Stein on the Danube. Fritz, the youngest, was spared from his father's wrath but was kept under close surveillance by the police due to the police records of his three elder brothers, and Canetti believed that his fascination with sculpting in stone was a form of psychological defence against his traumatic childhood.

Training and early commissions

From 1921 to 1925, he was trained as an engraver, as an apprentice in the engraving and die cutting workshop of Josef Schantin in Vienna.

From February to summer 1926, he attended the arts and trades school of the Austrian Museum of Art and Industry and open evening courses on nude drawing.

In fall 1926, he enrolled in studies in sculpting at the arts and trades school.

Through the end of his studies, he was a student of Anton Hanak, and received a stipend by the Vienna Society of Modern Art, the Austrian Chamber of Labor and the municipality of Vienna - which was obtained for him by the ministrations of Anna Mahler, who was his pupil and lover.

In 1933, he had a studio under the Stadtbahn, or Metro Rail Tracks. Canetti :"..it consisted of two big vaults supporting the Stadtbahn trestle; in one stood figures that would have got in his way while he was working in the other. When the weather wasn't too bad, he liked best to work in the open..." He continued to live at home with his widowed mother and his youngest sister in their old home in 31 Florianigasse, where he had been born, until he escaped after the Anschluss and Hitler's dictatorship over Austria to Switzerland for the duration of the war.

Work 
Probably his greatest work, on which he worked until his death, was the planning of the Church "of the Holy Trinity" in Mauer, Vienna, better known as Wotruba Church. He did not live to see the completion of the church in 1976.

Many of his statues can be seen in public parks in Vienna. The Lying Adolescent is located in an exhibition in the Albertina. He escaped to Switzerland upon Hitler's ascent to power. A number of his sculptures were either lost or destroyed during the Second World War.

In 1947, Wotruba was awarded the City of Vienna Prize for Visual Arts and in 1955, he received the Grand Austrian State Prize for Visual Arts.

He is buried in the Vienna Central Cemetery.

Gallery of Works

Further reading 
 Kerstin Jesse: "Formkunst nach 1945? Gedanken zur Rezeption am Beispiel Fritz Wotruba". In: Agnes Husslein-Arco, Alexander Klee (Hrsg.): Kubismus, Konstruktivismus, Formkunst. Vienna 2016, S. 87–101.
Wilfried Seipel, Fritz Wotruba Privatstiftung (Hrsg.): Fritz Wotruba (1907–1975) – Leben, Werk und Wirkung. Brandstätter, Wien 2012, .
 Agnes Husslein-Arco, Alfred Weidinger / Fritz Wotruba Verein, Wien (ed.): Fritz Wotruba – Einfachheit und Harmonie. Skulpturen und Zeichnungen aus der Zeit von 1927 – 1949. Verlag Bibliothek der Provinz, Weitra 2007, .
 Michael Semff (Hrsg.): Fritz Wotruba. Zeichnungen und Steine. Stuttgart 2007.
 Renata Antoniou: Fritz Wotruba. Das druckgraphische Werk. 1950–1975. Vienna 2003.
 Otto Breicha (Hrsg.): Fritz Wotruba. Werkverzeichnis. Skulpturen, Reliefs, Bühnen- und Architekturmodelle. St. Gallen 2002.
 Perdita von Kraft: Fritz Wotruba – Studien zu Leben und Werk: die Skulpturen der frühen und mittleren Jahre 1928–1947, unter Berücksichtigung der Schrift „Überlegungen. Gedanken zur Kunst“ von 1945.. VDG, Verlag und Datenbank für Geisteswissenschaft, Weimar 1999,  (Dissertation Uni Bonn 1999, 366 Seiten).
Matthias Haldemann (Hrsg.): Dialog mit der Moderne. Fritz Wotruba und die Sammlung Kamm. Katalog der Stiftung Sammlung Kamm. Balmer, Zug 1998.
Kunsthaus Zug (Hrsg.): Fritz Wotruba. Erschienen anlässlich der Retrospektive im Kunsthaus Zug 1992, Erker, St. Gallen 1992, .
 Otto Breicha (Hrsg.): Wotruba. Figur als Widerstand. Bilder und Schriften zu Leben und Werk. Salzburg 1977.

References

External links 

 Fritz Wotruba Society
 Fritz Wotruba in aeiou Encyclopedia

Cubist artists
Austrian sculptors
Austrian male sculptors
Austrian people of Czech descent
Austrian people of Hungarian descent
Artists from Vienna
Burials at the Vienna Central Cemetery
1907 births
1976 deaths
Recipients of the Grand Austrian State Prize
20th-century sculptors